David Orvis Short (May 11, 1917 – November 22, 1983) was a professional baseball player.  He was an outfielder for parts of two seasons (1940–41) with the Chicago White Sox.  For his career, he compiled a .091 batting average in 11 at-bats.  After playing for the Chicago White Sox he joined the military during World War II.  He was murdered in 1983.

An alumnus of Louisiana Tech University, he was born in Magnolia, Arkansas and later died in Shreveport, Louisiana at the age of 66.

References

External links

1917 births
1983 deaths
1983 murders in the United States
Chicago White Sox players
Major League Baseball outfielders
Baseball players from Arkansas
Kilgore Rangers players
Shreveport Sports players
Oklahoma City Indians players
Anniston Rams players
Little Rock Travelers players
Clarksdale Planters players
Paris Rockets players
Louisiana Tech Bulldogs baseball players
American military personnel of World War II
American murder victims
Male murder victims
People murdered in Louisiana